HMS Lion (or Lyon) was a stores hoy launched in 1709. She was wrecked at Port Isaac on 26 August 1752.

Lion was under the command of Samuel Wakerel, master. All of her crew was saved, as was some of her cargo of lumber.

Notes

References
 
 

Sloops of the Royal Navy
1700s ships
Maritime incidents in 1752